Nevidzany may refer to several villages in Slovakia:

Nevidzany, Zlaté Moravce District
Nevidzany, Prievidza District